Ahlam bint Ali bin Hazeem Al Shamsi (born February 13, 1968), better known as Ahlam, is an Emirati singer and actress. She has released a total of 14 albums and numerous singles. In 2011, Ahlam joined MBC's Arab Idol judging panel, for the inaugural season and the following three seasons. She was also judge and coach for season 4 in The Voice: Ahla Sawt singing competition.

Biography
Ahlam bint Ali bin Hazeem Al Shamsi was born in Abu Dhabi, United Arab Emirates, to an Emirati father and a Bahraini mother. Her father is an Emirati folk singer, Ali Al Shamsi. Ahlam was raised as a child in Bahrain. She is married to the famous Qatari rally champion, Mubarak Al-Hajiri, with whom she has three children, Fahed (born 2004), Fatima (2008) and Lulwa (2010).

She participated in many festivals around the Arab region and Western region, particularly the "Layali Dubai" festival. She has also been honored at several festivals across the Arab region and in the USA including at the Dolby Theatre. She was crowned queen of the Arab art in the Doha-Qatar Festival in 2003. She performed at the UNESCO Festival and Ledo Festival in France where she was the first Arab singer that sang twice. She also had performances at the Washington Festival in the US, the Albert Hall Festival in the UK and many other festivals in London.

In 2011, Ahlam joined MBC's Arab Idol judging panel alongside Lebanese singers Wael Kfoury and Nancy Ajram and Egyptian composer Hassan El Shafei. She stayed in the position for 4 consecutive seasons 1-4 broadcast 2012-2014 and 2017. She was also a judge and a coach in 2018 for season 4 of The Voice: Ahla Sawt singing competition.

In March 2016, after the first episode of her controversial show The Queen was broadcast on Dubai TV, a trending Twitter hashtag was launched by viewers and other people demanding that the program be stopped for multiple moral reasons including "lack of manners" and displaying "degrading acts". Several Lebanese journalists and known personalities took the opportunity to further criticize her for her opinions about the Lebanese including a Twitter hashtag to prevent her from entering Lebanon and other Arab countries. The program was stopped after just one episode by the Khaleeji broadcaster.

Discography

Albums
 أحبك موت (I Love You Till Death) (1995)
 مع السلامة (Goodbye) (1996)
 كيف ارضى (How Do I Accept) (1997)
 ما يصح الا الصحيح (Nothing is Right But Right) (1998)
 طبيعي (Natural) (1999)
 مختلف (Different) (2000)
 لعلمك بس (Just To Let You Know) (2001)
 أحسن (Better) (2003)
 الثقل صنعه (Weight) (2006)
 هذا أنا (This Is Me) (2009)
 موعدك (Your Time) (2013)
 أبتحداك (Challenge You) (2015)
 يلازمني خيالك (Your Fantasy Is Living With Me) (2016)
 فدوة عيونك (Love Of Your Eyes) (2021)

Awards and nominations 
She was rewarded by the Minister of Foreign Affairs in the United Arab Emirates by his Highness Sheikh Abdullah bin Zayed at the "Lamst Wafa" honouring Event. On July 21, 2011, it was announced that Ahlam would be on the judging panel of "Arab Idol", the Arabic version of the American Idol. Based on online statistics, Ahlam is first in terms of social media followers in the Middle East, one of the most active people online and her name has been one of the most searched keywords in the Google search engine.

References

External links
 

1968 births
Living people
Musicians from Dubai
Emirati actors
Emirati actresses
Emirati film actresses
Emirati women singers
Emirati musicians
Emirati people of Bahraini descent
Emirati Sunni Muslims
Bahraini musicians